Medythia suturalis, commonly known as striped bean flea beetle, is a species of leaf beetle found in China, India, Sri Lanka, Japan, Laos, Myanmar, North Korea, Philippines, South Korea, Taiwan, Vietnam, and Russia.

It is a major pest of beans and peas.

Description
Body length is about 2.8 mm. Anterior margin of labrum is entire. Postantennal tubercles are elongate. Black elytral stripe extend to the humerus.

References 

Galerucinae
Insects of Sri Lanka
Beetles described in 1858
Taxa named by Victor Motschulsky